Wuhu is a prefecture-level city in southeastern Anhui province, China.
With the urbanization trend in the southern part of Nanjing, a conurbation between Nanjing, Maanshan and Wuhu is in building with more than  10,660,000 inhabitants.

Administration
The prefecture-level city of Wuhu administers 8 county-level divisions, including 5 districts, 1 county, and 1 county-level city.

Defunct - Sanshan District

Climate

Demographics

Population 

As of the 2020 Chinese census, Wuhu had a total population of 3,644,420 inhabitants whom 1,622,799 lived its built-up (or metro) area made of Jiujiang District, Jinghu District and Yijiang District.
The city has over 47 ethnic minorities present — the largest being the Muslim population. There are other ethnic minorities with over 500 inhabitants in the city: Yi, Tujia, Miao, Zhuang, and Manchu.

Language 

Jiang-Huai Mandarin, a branch of Mandarin Chinese, is widely spoken in urban area, while some people in the counties speak Wu Chinese. Putonghua, or Standard Mandarin, was commonly used in this area.

History

Wuhu is known to have been inhabited since at least 770 BCE. It became a strategically important town during the Three Kingdoms period (220-280 AD), when it was controlled by the Eastern Wu. At this time it was known as Jiuzi (Chiu-tzu ). Under the Ming dynasty, Wuhu developed into a major commercial center and river port and since that time has been known as a center of the rice trade.

In 1644, the Hongguang Emperor (better known as the Prince of Fu), one of the last emperors of the Ming Dynasty, was captured by forces of the new Qing Dynasty in Wuhu. During the Taiping Rebellion, Wuhu exchanges hands over five times between Taiping and Imperial forces. The city became a treaty port in 1876 and has remained a commercial center since that time. The city's Roman Catholic cathedral, St. Joseph's Cathedral, dates from this time. Most of the downtown area alongside the Yangtze River was ceded in the British concession.

Trade in rice, wood, and tea flourished at Wuhu until the Warlord Era of the 1920s and 1930s, when bandits were active in the area.

At the beginning of the Second Sino-Japanese War, part of the Second World War, Wuhu was occupied by Japan on December 10, 1937. This was a prelude to the Battle of Nanjing, ending in the Nanjing Massacre. Under Japanese occupation, Chinese resistance fighters hid in the lakes around Wuhu by submerging themselves and breathing through reeds.

Major industries began to be developed in Wuhu after the Second World War, with the development of the textile industry, shipbuilding, and paper mills. Despite this, Wuhu had been lagging behind Ma'anshan and Tongling in industrial production for decades after the establishment of the People's Republic of China and remained primarily a commercial center for trade in rice, silk, cotton, tea, wheat and eggs. However, with recent years' economic rise, Wuhu has become a hub for manufacturing.

In July 2016, Nanling and Wuwei counties suffered serious damage from heavy rain.

Economy
The city is the second largest economy in Anhui, after Hefei, the provincial capital. In 2019, Wuhu's GDP reached RMB 361.826 billion. Its per capita GDP was RMB 96533 (app.$13790).

Wuhu Economic & Technological Development Area in the north of the city launched in 1993 is one of the first state-level economic and technological development area in Anhui province. It has the only export processing zone in the province. Chery Automobile and Anhui Conch Cement Company are headquartered in this development area.

Wuhu is the fifth largest port alongside Yangtze River. Yuxikou Pier is the largest inland river coal harbor in China.

Transportation

Bus 
Buses in Wuhu start at ¥1 for a general bus and ¥2 for air-conditioned buses.

Taxi 
During the day, taxis start at ¥7; after 2.5 km, the price increases at ¥1.8 per km. From 10 p.m. to 5 a.m. taxis start at ¥8 and after 2.5 km, the prices increase at a rate of ¥2.5 for each additional km. There is a free 4 minutes of waiting time due to traffic/red lights. Afterwards it's an additional ¥0.34 for every minute during the day and ¥0.38 for every minute at night.

Airport 
The city is served by the Wuhu Xuanzhou Airport which opened on April 30, 2021.

Bridge

Wuhu has one Yangtze River crossing—the Wuhu Yangtze River Bridge, opened in 2000, carries the G5011 Wuhu–Hefei Expressway and Huainan Railway.

Train
Wuhu is served by the Anhui–Jiangxi, Nanjing–Tongling and Huainan Railways. It only takes 2.5 hours from Shanghai to Wuhu by high-speed train.

Metro system

Wuhu Rail Transit consists of two lines (Lines 1 and 2) which opened on November 3 and December 28, 2021.

Culture
The acclaimed poet Li Bai spent his late life in Wuhu, it is said, due to its striking landscape. Li Bai was born in Suyab, an ancient Silk Road city in Central Asian, and raised in southwestern China. Xie Tiao, one of the most distinctive Six Dynasty poets whom he greatly admired, left many poems when holding positions here.

During the Tang dynasty (619-907), the poet Du Mu wrote a famous poem Thoughts on Staying Again at Wuhu.

A factory in Wuhu carries on the local craft of making wrought iron pictures. Other local handicrafts are embossed lacquerware and rice straw pith patchwork. A famous stone tablet in Wuhu recording local events of the Song dynasty period (ca. 1000 AD) is considered to be a masterpiece of the renowned calligrapher Mi Fu.

Folklore
An itinerant blacksmith named Tang Tianchi is reputed to have invented the wrought-iron picture in Wuhu, when a painter whom he admired chided him, "You will never make pictures by beating iron."

Another blacksmith of the Spring and Autumn period (770-476 BC) named Gan Jiang was famous for sword making. Zhe Shan (Reddish Brown Hill) is said to get its colour from the flames of Gan Jiang's furnace. Shen Shan (Sacred Hill) is the legendary location of his sword grinding rock and tempering pool.

Cuisine
Wuhu and Anqing are noted centers of the Yanjiang cuisine. It specializes in freshwater fish and poultry, and features special techniques of chopping, shaping, and colouring. The flavour of Yanjiang dishes is often enhanced by sweetening and smoking.

Religion/Medicine

The New York Methodist Mission Society's Superintendent Virgil C. Hart arrived in Wuhu in 1881, intent on purchasing a piece of property to build the city's first Methodist Church and Western-style hospital. Hart was able to secure the Yichisan Hill before the British, who wanted the property to build a consulate and naval base. The Yichisan Hospital is Anhui's oldest/continuous western hospital. Dr. Edgerton H. Hart (V.C. Hart's eldest son) became the hospital's Director in 1895 and continued at that capacity until his death in April 1913. Caroline Maddock arrived in Wuhu in October, 1904, to serve as the General Hospital's Head Nurse. Caroline Maddock married Dr. Edgerton Hart in October 1907. In 1909, Caroline and four other nurses founded the Nurses Association of China and she served as its first president; this association still represents China's Nurse profession.

Heritage and Tourism

Several sites in Wuhu have been included on the China's List of Major National Historical and Cultural Sites. They include the Guangji Temple, a Buddhist temple originally dating back to the Tang dynasty that contains the Zhe pagoda, an edifice from the Northern Song dynasty. 

Other listed monuments date back to the 19th century, when Wuhu was a British treaty port. These include St. Joseph Cathedral, the site of the former British Consulate, the former Customs Building on the Yangtze River and the site of the former St. James Secondary School.

Other touristic sites in Wuhu:
Mirror Lake
Jiuzi Plaza
Yangtze Riverside Park
Mount Zhe, a hill park
Fantawild Adventure, one of the largest theme parks in the Chinese Mainland
Sculpture Park
Longwo Lake
Phoenix Cuisine Boulevard
Maren Qifeng Scenic Area
Jiuzi Old Town
Macrolink Beluga Ocean Park
Wuhu Olympic Stadium
Yangtze River Bridge Crossing

Education
Universities and Colleges
Anhui Normal University
Anhui Polytechnic University
Wannan Medical College
Wuhu Radio and TV University
Wuhu Institute of Technology
Anhui Business College of Vocational Technology
Anhui Technical College of Mechanical and Electrical Engineering
Anhui college of Chinese traditional medicine
Anhui vocational college of information technology

High Schools
Wuhu City No. 1 High School()
High School Affiliated to Anhui Normal University()
Wuhu County No. 1 High School
Wuhu City No. 12 High School
Fanchang County No. 1 High School

Health care system
Notable hospitals
Yijishan Hospital (or Affiliated Hospital of Wannan Medical College
Xuancheng Area Hospital, or Second Affiliated Hospital of Wannan Medical College
Wuhu Second Hospital
Wuhu First Hospital
Wuhu Third Hospital
Wuhu Fourth Hospital
Wuhu Fifth Hospital
Wuhu Hospital of Traditional Chinese Medicine
Maternal and Child Health Hospital of Wuhu City
Wuhu Red Cross Hospital

Related health care settings
Wuhu CDC
Wuhu Center of Blood

Notable people 
Xiao Yuncong (1596–1673), Ming Dynasty painter
Zhao Wei (born 1976), actress
Zhou Lüxin (born 1988), diver
Wang Ying, (1913–1974) actress and author
Jackie Chan (born 1954), actor and martial artist (father from Wuhu)
Chen Duxiu (October 8, 1879 – May 27, 1942) was a Chinese revolutionary socialist, educator, philosopher and author, who co-founded the Chinese Communist Party (with Li Dazhao) in 1921, serving from 1921 to 1927 as its first General Secretary.  (teacher of Wanjiang school.)
Wang Chuanfu (born 1966), billionaire, founder and CEO of BYD Company.

Notable constructions
  tall pylons of HVDC Yangtze River Crossing Wuhu, a part of HVDC Three Gorges-Changzhou, are the tallest pylons used for HVDC.

In popular culture
Nintendo added Wuhu Island to Wii Sports Resort.

Sister cities and friendly cities
  Kōchi, Kōchi Prefecture, Japan
  Pavia, Lombardy, Italy
  Torrejón de Ardoz, Madrid, Spain
  West Covina, California, United States

References

External links
Government website of Wuhu 
Wuhu.Me - English Community of City Wuhu, Anhui. China

 
Cities in Anhui
Port cities and towns in China